Looney Tunes Super Stars' Porky & Friends: Hilarious Ham is a DVD featuring 18 cartoons, with most of them featuring Porky Pig. 16 of the shorts are new to DVD, while two were previously available in the Looney Tunes Golden Collection. This was the first DVD in the Looney Tunes Super Stars series to present the post-1953 cartoons in original fullscreen format only, with no matted 1:85 widescreen format option. The DVD was released on November 6, 2012.

Contents

Notes  
 According to Jerry Beck, the reason the two Bunny and Claude cartoons were included on the DVD was for filler.
 While the set claims that all the cartoons on the set are "remastered for the first time into pristine, first-run condition," "Wagon Heels" and "Boobs in the Woods" were previously released restored on the Looney Tunes Golden Collection: Volume 5 and the Looney Tunes Golden Collection, respectively. In addition, "One Meat Brawl" uses the USA 1995 dubbed version transfer and "Ant Pasted" uses the 1998 dubbed version transfer, hence the cue marks at the iris out and the closing of the rings.
 On the back of the DVD, photos of "Tick Tock Tuckered", "Daffy Doodles", and "Nothing but the Tooth" are shown—however, these cartoon aren't actually included on the DVD. "Tick Tock Tuckered" was released on Looney Tunes Super Stars' Daffy Duck: Frustrated Fowl; "Daffy Doodles" and "Nothing but the Tooth" have not seen a home video release as part of a Looney Tunes DVD series, although "Daffy Doodles" appears as an extra on the DVD of the Warner Bros. movie My Reputation, using the 1995 USA dubbed version transfer.
 The PAL version of the DVD includes "One Meat Brawl" with the red borders at the opening titles as it was sourced from the 1995 PAL Dubbed Version print.
 "Ant Pasted" 1953 English audiotrack on PAL DVD release is played with low-pitched audio.

References 

Looney Tunes home video releases